Scunthorpe United Football Club, an English association football club based in Scunthorpe, Lincolnshire, was founded in 1899 as the result of a merger between Brumby Hall F.C. and another club. The team first entered the national cup competition, the FA Cup, in 1909–10; they beat Withernsea 8–0 in the preliminary round before losing 4–0 to York City in the first qualifying round. In 1910, after amalgamating with North Lindsey United, the club took the name Scunthorpe & Lindsey United, and two years later, it became a member of the Midland League. The first team finished that initial season in the lower reaches of the table, but when competitive football resumed after the First World War, they enjoyed consecutive top-seven finishes, culminating in their first Midland League title in 1926–27, a success fuelled by 52 goals from former England international Ernie Simms. They again won the title in 1938–39, and it seemed for much of the season as if Harry Johnson was sure to overtake Simms' total, but he missed several matches in the later part of the season and had to settle for 49.

Scunthorpe made their first application to join the Football League ahead of the formation of the Northern Section of the Third Division in 1921; they were not elected, and their bids for election continued to fail until the League's next expansion, in 1950. The voting was tight, but Scunthorpe became one of two Midland League teams to join the Northern Section when each regional third-tier division grew from 22 to 24. They finished the 1950–51 Football League season in mid-table, and seven years later won the Third Division North titlethe last season of that league before the regional divisions were amalgamated into national Third and Fourth Divisionsby a seven-point margin. They also reached the fifth round (last 16) of the FA Cup for the first time, defeating First Division club Newcastle United and holding Liverpool for 75 minutes before conceding the only goal of the match.

Ahead of their Second Division debut, the club dropped the Lindsey from its name, becoming plain Scunthorpe United. They spent six seasons at that level, and finished a club record fourth in 1961–62, five points behind the second promotion place. After four seasons in the Third Division, they dropped to the Fourth, in which they remained for the next 36 years, apart from three single-season ventures into the higher level; the last of those, in 1999–2000, came courtesy of their fifth attempt at promotion via the play-offs. The Football League rebranded their divisions ahead of the 2004–05 season, so that the fourth tier became Football League Two, and the change of name coincided with a change of fortune for Scunthorpe. Gaining promotion to League One as runners-up, ahead of Swansea City on goal difference, this time they not only stayed up but went on to win the League One title in 2006–07. Relegated in their first season in the Championship, they came straight back via the play-offs to spend another two seasons in the second tier. In 2008–09, they lost to Luton Town in the final of the Football League Trophy, a cup competition open to teams from the third and fourth tiers of the English football league system, and the following season, they reached the last 16 of the League Cup for the first time. Two relegations in three years returned them to the fourth tier, from which they bounced straight back as 2013–14 runners-up. After twice reaching the play-offs, they were relegated to League Two in 2019 before, in a chaotic 2021–22 season, finishing bottom of that division to put an end to their 72-year spell in the Football League.

As of the end of the 2021–22 season, the team have spent 38 seasons in the fourth tier of the English football league system, 25 in the third, and 9 in the second. The table details the team's achievements in senior first-team competitions and the top league goalscorer, where known, from their debut season in the FA Cup in 1909–10 to the end of the most recently completed season.

Key

Key to league record:
P – Played
W – Games won
D – Games drawn
L – Games lost
F – Goals for
A – Goals against
Pts – Points
Pos – Final position
Key to colours and symbols:

Key to divisions:
Mid – Midland League
Div 3N – Football League Third Division North
Div 2 – Football League Second Division
Div 3 – Football League Third Division
Div 4 – Football League Fourth Division
Champ – Football League Championship
League 1 – Football League One, EFL League One
League 2 – Football League Two, EFL League Two

Key to stages of competitions:
Group – Group stage
Prelim – Preliminary round
QR1 – First qualifying round
QR2 – Second qualifying round, etc.
R1 – First round
R2 – Second round, etc.
QF – Quarter-final
SF – Semi-final
F – Runners-up
W – Winners
(N) – Northern section of regionalised stage

Details of the abandoned 1939–40 season are shown in italics and appropriately footnoted.

Seasons

Notes

References

External links
Scunthorpe United F.C. official website

Seasons
 
Scunthorpe United